Zarzar (also known as Raz Zarzar) is a village in Sojas Rud Rural District, Sojas Rud District, Khodabandeh County, Zanjan Province, Iran. At the 2006 census, its population was 608, in 116 families.

References 

Populated places in Khodabandeh County